John Charles Smith (August 18, 1896 – January 3, 1933), known professionally as Jack Pickford, was a Canadian-American actor, film director and producer. He was the younger brother of actresses Mary and Lottie Pickford.

After their father deserted the family, all three Pickford children began working as child actors on the stage. Mary later became a highly popular silent film actress, producer and early Hollywood pioneer. While Jack also appeared in numerous films as the "All American boy next door" and was a fairly popular performer, he was overshadowed by his sister's success. His career declined steadily due to alcohol, drugs and chronic depression.

Early life
John Charles Smith was born in 1896 in Toronto, Ontario, to John Charles Smith, an English immigrant odd-job man of Methodist background, and Charlotte Hennessy Smith, who was Irish Catholic. As a child he was known as 'Jack'. His alcoholic father deserted the family while Pickford was a young child, leaving the family impoverished. Out of desperation, Charlotte allowed Jack and his two sisters Gladys and Lottie to appear onstage, beginning with Gladys, the eldest. This proved a good source of income and, by 1900, the family had relocated to New York City and the children were acting in plays across the United States.

Due to work the family was constantly separated until 1910 when Gladys signed with Biograph Studios. By this time, his sister Gladys Smith had been transformed into Mary Pickford (Marie was her middle name, and Pickford an old family name). Following suit, the Smiths changed their stage names to 'Pickford'.

Soon after signing with Biograph, Mary secured jobs for all the family, including the then-14-year-old Jack. When the Biograph Company headed west to Hollywood, only Mary was to go until Jack pleaded to join the company as well. Much to Mary's protest, Charlotte threw him on the train as it left the station. The company arrived in Hollywood, where Jack acted in bit parts during the stay.

Mary soon became a well-known star, and by 1917 had signed a contract for $1 million with First National Pictures. As part of her contract, Mary saw to it that her family was brought along, giving the now-named Jack Pickford a lucrative contract with the company as well.

Acting career

By the time he signed with First National, Pickford had played bit parts in 95 shorts and films. Though Pickford was considered an excellent actor, he was seen as someone who never lived up to his potential. In 1917, he starred in one of his first major roles as Pip in the adaptation of Charles Dickens' Great Expectations as well as the title role in Mark Twain's Tom Sawyer and the follow-up Huck and Tom in 1918.

In early 1918, after the United States entered World War I, Pickford joined the United States Navy as an enlisted sailor and was stationed at the Third Naval District in Manhattan, New York. By 1923, his roles had gone from several a year to one. In 1928, he finished his last film, acting as Clyde Baxter in Gang War. Through the years, he dabbled in screen writing and directing; however, he never pursued either form further. Most of his films, especially those in the late 1910s, were both commercial and critical successes, making a highly regarded name for himself. Pickford's image was that of the All-American boy, with his sister being “America’s Sweetheart.” In all, Pickford appeared in more than 130 movies between 1908 and 1928.

Personal life

Marriages

Pickford met actress and Ziegfeld girl Olive Thomas at a beach cafe on the Santa Monica Pier. Screenwriter and director Frances Marion later commented on the couple's lifestyle:

Pickford and Thomas eloped on October 25, 1916, in New Jersey. None of their family was present and their only witness was Thomas Meighan. The couple had no children of their own, though in 1920, they adopted Olive's then-six-year-old nephew when his mother died. Although by most accounts Olive was the love of Pickford's life, the marriage was stormy and filled with highly charged conflict, followed by lavish making up through the exchange of expensive gifts. For many years the Pickfords had intended to vacation together and with their marriage on the rocks, the couple decided to take a second honeymoon.

In August 1920, the pair traveled to Paris, hoping to combine a vacation with some film preparations. On the night of September 5, 1920, the couple went out for a night of entertainment and partying at the famous bistros in the Montparnasse quarter of Paris. They returned to their room in the Hôtel Ritz around 3:00 a.m. It was rumored Thomas may have taken cocaine that night, though it was never proven. She was intoxicated and tired, and took a large dose of mercury bichloride, a common item for bathroom cleaning. She was taken to the American Hospital in the Paris suburb of Neuilly, where Pickford, together with his former brother-in-law Owen Moore, remained at her side until she succumbed to the poison a few days later. Rumors arose that she had either tried to die by suicide or had been murdered. A police investigation followed, as well as an autopsy, and Thomas's death was ruled accidental.

Pickford married two more times. On July 31, 1922, he married Marilyn Miller (1898–1936), a celebrated Broadway dancer and former Ziegfeld girl, at his sister and brother-in-law's famed home Pickfair. By most accounts it was an abusive marriage due to Pickford's drug abuse and alcoholism. They separated in 1926 and Miller was granted a French divorce in November 1927.

Pickford's final marriage was to Mary Mulhern, aged 22 and a former Ziegfeld girl, whom he married on August 12, 1930. Within three months Pickford grew increasingly volatile towards Mulhern. After two years Mulhern left Pickford, claiming he had mistreated her throughout the marriage. She was granted an interlocutory divorce in February 1932 which had yet to be finalized at the time of Pickford's death.

Death and legacy
In 1932, Pickford visited his sister Mary at Pickfair. According to Mary, he looked ill and emaciated; his clothes were hanging on him as if he were a clothes hanger. Mary Pickford recalled in her autobiography that she felt a wave of premonition when watching her brother leave. As they started down the stairs to the automobile entrance, Jack called back to her "Don’t come down with me, Mary dear, I can go alone." Mary later wrote that as she stood at the top of the staircase, an inner voice said "That’s the last time you’ll see Jack".

Jack Pickford, at age 36, died at the American Hospital of Paris on January 3, 1933. The cause for his death was listed as "progressive multiple neuritis which attacked all the nerve centers". This was believed due to his alcoholism. Mary Pickford arranged for his body to be returned to Los Angeles, where he was interred in the private Pickford plot at Forest Lawn Memorial Park, Glendale.

For his contribution to the motion picture industry, Jack Pickford has a star on the Hollywood Walk of Fame at 1523 Vine Street.

Selected filmography

Bibliography
 Arvidson, Linda. When the Movies Were Young. New York: Dover Publications, Inc., 1969.
 Menefee, David W. The First Male Stars: Men of the Silent Era. Albany: Bear Manor Media, 2007.
 Talmadge, Margaret L. The Talmadge Sisters. Philadelphia: J. B. Lippincott Company, 1924.
 Paris Authorities Investigate Death of Olive Thomas. The New York Times, September 11, 1920.
 POLICE DEMAND FURTHER PROBE OF OLIVE THOMAS' DEATH, The Washington times. (Washington D.C.) 1902-1939, September 12, 1920.
 Holmstrom, John. The Moving Picture Boy: An International Encyclopaedia from 1895 to 1995, Norwich: Michael Russell, 1996, pp. 10–11. 
 Mary Pickford: America's Sweetheart by Scott Eyman 
 Pickford: The Woman Who Made Hollywood by Eileen Whitfield
 The First King of Hollywood: The Life of Douglas Fairbanks by Tracey Goessel 
 Michelle Vogel. Olive Thomas: The Life and Death of a Silent Film Beauty 
 Steve Vaught. "You Don’t Know Jack – A Second Take on Jack Pickford"
"Cleanup of Paris Cafes May Follow Movie Stars Death" Daily News, September 14, 1920
 Amy Marie. "The Final Years of Jack Pickford"
 Gordon Thomas. "Beautiful Dead Girl: On Early Hollywood Casualty Olive Thomas"
 Shane Brown. "The Man Who Had Everything: The Curious Case of Jack Pickford and the New York Times"

See also
 Canadian Pioneers in Early Hollywood

References

External links

 
 
 
 Family Photos - The Mary Pickford Foundation
 Jack Pickford - Virtual History
 In Mary's Shadow: The Story of Jack Pickford (2001) Documentary

1896 births
1933 deaths
20th-century American male actors
20th-century Canadian male actors
American film directors
American male film actors
American male silent film actors
American male stage actors
American male child actors
Burials at Forest Lawn Memorial Park (Glendale)
Canadian emigrants to the United States
Canadian male child actors
Canadian male film actors
Canadian male silent film actors
Canadian male stage actors
Film directors from Toronto
Male actors from Toronto
Silent film directors
United States Navy sailors
Deaths from polio